The following is a list of municipal presidents of Acapulco de Juárez municipality, in the state of Guerrero, Mexico.

References

This article incorporates information from the Spanish Wikipedia.

Acapulco de Juárez
Politicians from Guerrero